Kushinagar is a town in the Kushinagar district in Uttar Pradesh, India.

Etymology
According to Buddhist tradition Kushavati was named prior to the king Kush. The naming of Kushwati is believed to be due to abundance of Kush grass found in this region.

History

Iron Age
The present Kushinagar is identified with Kusavati (in the pre-Buddha period) and Kushinara (in the post-Buddha period). It was the capital of one of the two Malla republics. The two Malla republics comprised one of the sixteen mahajanpads (oligarchic republics) of India in the 6th century BCE. Since then, it remained an integral part of the erstwhile empires of Maurya, Shunga, Kushana, Gupta, Harsha, and Pala dynasties.

Location of Gautama Buddha's death and parinirvana

When the Buddha reached his eightieth year, he felt that his time in this world was approaching an end. At that time, according to the Mahāparinibbāṇa Sutta (Sutta 16 of the Dīgha Nikāya), he and some of his disciples undertook a months-long journey that would take them from Rājagṛha, through Pāṭaliputta, Vesāli, Bhoganagara, and Pāvā, to their final destination at Kushinagar. It was at Pāvā that Cunda, a resident of Pāvā, invited the group to a meal that featured a food called sukaramaddava. This would prove to be the Buddha's last meal, as he was afflicted by a painful illness resembling dysentery soon after consuming the meal. After the meal, the Buddha crossed the Kakkuttha River (now called the Khanua River) and completed his journey to Kushinagar.

According to the Mahāparinibbāṇa Sutta, the Buddha attained parinirvana shortly after his arrival in Kushinagar. Seven days after his parinirvana, the remains of the Buddha were cremated at that location. Originally his ashes were to go only to the Sakya clan, to which the Buddha belonged. However, six other clans and a king demanded the ashes of the Buddha. In order to resolve this dispute, a Brahmin named Drona divided the ashes of the Buddha into eight portions. These portions were distributed as follows: to Ajātasattu, king of Magadha; to the Licchavis of Vesāli; to the Sakyas of Kapilavastu; to the Bulis of Allakappa; to the Koliyas of Rāmagāma; to the brahmin of Veṭhadīpa; to the Mallas of Pāvā; and to the Mallas of Kushinagar. In addition to these eight portions, two other important relics were distributed at that time: Drona (the brahmin who distributed the relics) received the vessel in which the body had been cremated, and the Moriyas of Pipphalivana received the remaining ashes of the funeral pyre. According to Buddhaghosa, Each of these ten portions was placed in a reliquary (such as the Kanishka casket or the Bimaran casket) and buried in a tumulus. These tumuli have been expanded or reconstructed over many centuries to form large stupas. Of these, the only one which remains intact is the Ramagrama stupa in Ramgram, Nepal.

5th century CE - 18th century CE
During the medieval period, Kushinagar was under the suzerainty of Kalachuri kings. The city was largely abandoned after the Islamic invasions of the 12th century, although the region was ruled over by a Rajput king named Madan Singh in the 15th century.

19th century
The earliest mention of the ruins at Kushinagar in modern literature was in 1837, by D. Liston. Liston noted that it was "an object of worship" and pilgrimage site, but misunderstood the ruins to be the remnants of the fortress of a powerful divinity by the name of Mata Koonr.

Kushinagar came back into prominence when Alexander Cunningham performed archaeological excavations at Matha Kuar shrine and Ramabhar stupa in 1861-1862. Cunningham was the first archaeologist to identify the ruins as being the site of the parinirvana of the Buddha. Archibald Carlleyle exposed the Mahaparinirvana stupa and also discovered a  meters long reclining Buddha statue in 1876. In 1901, a Burmese monk named Sayadaw U Chandramani applied to the English Governor of India, seeking his permission to allow pilgrims to worship the reclining Buddha image in Kushinagar. Excavations continued in the early twentieth century under J. Ph. Vogel. He conducted archaeological campaigns in 1904–1905, 1905-1906 and 1906–1907, uncovering a wealth of Buddhist materials.

In 1896, Laurence Waddell suggested that the site of the death and parinirvana of Gautama Buddha was in the region of Rampurva. However, according to the Mahāparinibbāṇa Sutta, the Buddha made his journey to Kushinagar, where he walked into a grove of sala trees and laid himself to rest. There, he died and was cremated on the seventh day after his death. The accumulated body of archaeological evidence and the historical record both support the assertion that the Buddha died and was cremated in Kushinagar.

Archaeological evidence from the 3rd century BCE suggests that Kushinagar was an ancient pilgrimage site. For example, Ashoka built a stupa and placed a pillar to mark Buddha's attained parinirvana in Kushinagar. The Hindu rulers of the Gupta Empire (fourth to seventh century) enlarged the stupa and constructed a temple containing a reclining Buddha statue. This site was abandoned by Buddhist monks around 1200 CE, who fled to escape the invading Muslim army, after which the site decayed during the Islamic rule in India that followed. British archaeologist Alexander Cunningham rediscovered Kushinagar in the late 19th century, and his colleague Archibald Carlleyle unearthed the 1,500-year-old reclining Buddha statue. The site has since then become an important pilgrimage site for Buddhists.

20th century
After independence, Kushinagar remained a part of the district of Deoria. On 13 May 1994, it came into being as a new district of Uttar Pradesh.

Modern Kushinagar

Demographics
According to the 2011 Census of India, Kushinagar had 3462 households and a total population of 22,214, of which 11,502 were males and 10,712 were females. The population within the age group of 0 to 6 years was 2,897. The total number of literate people in Kushinagar was 15,150, which constituted 68.2% of the population with male literacy of 73.3% and female literacy of 62.7%. The Scheduled Castes and Scheduled Tribes population was 1,117 (5.03%) and 531 (2.39%) respectively.

Government and politics
Kushinagar comes under Kushinagar Lok Sabha constituency for Indian general elections. The Member of Parliament from this constituency is Vijay Kumar Dubey of Bharatiya Janata Party  who was elected in the 2019 Indian general election. As of 2019, the Member of Legislative Assembly (MLA) from Kushinagar Assembly constituency is Rajnikant Mani Tripathi of Bharatiya Janata Party.

Transportation
Kushinagar is well connected by air, rail, and road. Within the town, public transport is provided by taxis, auto rickshaws, and cycle rickshaws. The city is served by Kushinagar International Airport and Gorakhpur Junction railway station.

The Government of Uttar Pradesh has proposed the Kushinagar-Sarnath Buddha Expressway to connect these two Buddhist pilgrimage towns. The expressway will be around 200 km long and will greatly reduce the travel time between the towns.

As a Buddhist pilgrimage site
Parinirvana Temple
The statue of the reclining Buddha is inside the Parinirvana Temple. The statue is 6.10 metres long and is made of a single block of red sandstone. It represents the Buddha in the position he was in when he died and attained parinirvana — reclining on his right side with his head to the north, feet to the south, and face towards the west. It is situated on a large brick platform with stone posts at the corners.

Parinirvana Stupa
The Parinirvana Stupa (Nirvana Chaitya) is located just behind the Parinirvana Temple. It was excavated by Carlleyle in the year 1876. During excavations, a copper plate was found, which contained the text of the Nidana Sutra and the statement that plate had been deposited in the Nirvana Chaitya by one Haribala, who also installed the reclining Buddha statue in the temple.

Ramabhar Stupa
Ramabhar Stupa (also called Mukutbandhan Chaitya) is the cremation place of Buddha. This site is 1.5 km east of the Parinirvana Temple on the Kushinagar-Deoria road.

Matha Kuar Shrine
This shrine contains a large statue of Buddha, carved out of one block of stone, which represents the Buddha seated under the Bodhi Tree in a pose known as bhumi sparsh mudra (Earth-touching attitude). The inscription at the base of statue dates to the 10th or 11th century CE.

Other major places
Mata Bhagawati Devi Mandir: This is a Hindu temple situated at Buddha Ghat.
Indo-Japan-Sri Lanka Temple: This is an interesting example of modern Buddhist architecture.
Wat Thai Temple: This is a huge complex built in a typical Thai-Buddhist architectural fashion.
Ruins and brick structures: These are located around the Parinirvana Temple and Stupa. These are the remains of various monasteries and votive stupas constructed in the ancient period.
Several museums, meditation parks and other temples based on architecture of various Asian countries.

International relations
Kushinagar has one official sister city:
 Lumbini, Nepal (2022)

Notable people
Mr. Dharikshan Mishra, Bhojpuri poet
 Mr. Sachchidananda Vatsyayan 'Agyeya', noted Hindi writer
 Mr. Vijay Kumar Dubey, politician and Member of Parliament for Kushi Nagar
  Mr. Ram Nagina Mishra, former Member of Parliament
  Mr. Baleshwar Yadav, former Lok Sabha MP
 Rajesh Pandey, member of 16th Lok Sabha, also served as a Member of Legislative Council in Uttar Pradesh
Manya Singh, Indian model and beauty pageant title holder
 R. P. N. Singh, former member of parliament from Indian National Congress, also served as Minister of State for Road and Transport, Minister of State for Petroleum and Natural Gas in the cabinet of former Prime minister, Dr. Manmohan Singh

Gallery

See also

References

Further reading
A Literary History of Deoria & Kushinagar by M.A. Lari Azad (USM 1998 Ghaziabad)
Patil, D R (1981). Kusīnagara, New Delhi : Archaeological Survey of India.
Ujjwal Mishra (A student) says; "You can visit kushinagar for picnic as there is so much ancient history to see along with its the calmest place in whole kushinagar district".

External links

Official Photo Gallery of Kushinagar
 Entry on Kusinara (Kushinagar) in the Dictionary of Pali Proper Names
 Kushinagar, Archaeological Survey of India, Sarnath Circle

Cities and towns in Kushinagar district
Buddhist pilgrimage sites in India
Ancient Indian cities
Archaeological monuments in Uttar Pradesh
Buddhist sites in Uttar Pradesh